Cihuri is a village in the province and autonomous community of La Rioja, Spain.

History 

In the year 947 the Spanish count Fernán González, donated to the monastery of San Millán de la Cogolla, a monastery which was dedicate to San Juan Bautista  located in Zufiuri, After a short period the same count gave the title of villa to this village. This caused some conflicts between the inhabitants of the villa and the friars. Due to that, the villa became to rename Cihuri de San Millán.

In the middle of the 11th century, King Fernando I de Castilla, confirmed any  assignment of Fernan Gonzalez to San Millán and broad with the donation of lands, vineyards, orchards, meadows, fruit trees and Cihuri mills.

In 1075 with the occasion of the transfer of the work by the monarch Mr Sancho Garcés IV de Navarra and his wife Mrs Placencia to the monastery of San Millán, a farm called  Urturi and another place called Zagazabarnowadays called Zaharra in areas close to Ciguri.

In 1077  a dispute occurs between the Monastery of San Millán and the neighboring Cihuri, Pelayo Sarracinez and Gonzalo Sarracinez for refusing to comply with its obligations to settlers with the monastery. Alfonso VI referred the case to the merino, and this the ruled in favor of San Millán, but took the matter to be resolved. The discontent of the Sarracinez with justice encouraged them to kill the real sent and to undertake an immediate flight of Cihuri.

In 1080 Messrs. Orbit Aznares and Sancho Ortiz, give way to the monastery of San Millán their properties in the monastery of albiano, near Cihuri

At the end of 19th century the villa ceased to belong to the Monastery of San Millán

Cihuri formed part of the judicial district of Santo Domingo de la Calzada, in the province of Burgos, up to the creation of the province of Logróño.

Demography 
On 1 January 2010 the municipality's population amounted to 215 inhabitants, 115 men and 100 women.

Politics

Patrimony 
 The Church of San Juan Bautista: Constructed in the neoclassical style of the 19th century. The reredos of the high altar were built in the first half of the 18th century and its style is baroque.
 The House of Priorato: House of the 17th century with shield of the Monastery of San Millán. Located outside the urban core.

 Romano Bridge: Situated in the house of Priorato. It was rebuilt in the Middle Ages. It was declared to be of cultural interest in the category of monuments on 26 February 1982.

Gastronomy 
 Meson La Fragua: Situated in the main square called Dr. Asuero offers some delicious food.

Local festivals 
 15 May, the feast of San Isidro Labrador. There is a pilgrimage to the hill of slavery, located 2 km away from the town center near the  Obarenes mountains, where the legend said that in a cave there appeared an image of the Virgin and this is called since then of slavery. In his honor and along with the image of San Isidro, celebrates Mass in the own closed, followed by picnic, dances...
 From 6 to 9 August is the festival in honor of Mr Clemente.
 The third Saturday in September, the Festival of thanks is celebrated by the people in Cihuri

See also 
 La Rioja (Spain)

References 

http://www.cihuri.org/
http://es.wikiloc.com/rutas/outdoor/espana/la-rioja/cihuri
https://web.archive.org/web/20130922222054/http://www.ine.es/jaxi/tabla.do?path=%2Ft20%2Fe260%2Fa2010%2Fl0%2F&file=mun42.px&type=pcaxis&L=0

Populated places in La Rioja (Spain)